Génesis Valentín Suárez (born 20 March 1998) is a Puerto Rican badminton player. In 2013, she became the runner-up at the Carebaco International tournament in the women's doubles event. In 2014, she competed at the Central American and Caribbean Games in Veracruz, Mexico. She also became the runner-up at the Puerto Rico International tournament in the women's singles event.

Achievements

BWF International Challenge/Series 
Women's singles

Women's doubles

  BWF International Challenge tournament
  BWF International Series tournament
  BWF Future Series tournament

References

External links 
 
 

1998 births
Living people
Puerto Rican female badminton players
Competitors at the 2014 Central American and Caribbean Games